Sadowsky Guitars Limited is an American high-end guitar, bass guitar, and preamps manufacturer based in Long Island City, New York.

History
The company was started in 1979 and took its name from its founder, Roger Sadowsky, known for "being one of the industry's master craftsmen".  As of 2011 the company has 10 employees involved in instrument manufacturing excluding Sadowsky himself.
Sadowsky started out modifying vintage Fender basses, which were at that time inexpensive, to improve their sound by adding more noise reduction technology and replacing the passive electronics with an active preamp, which increases the bass's signal-to-noise ratio. Once the price of vintage bass guitars began to increase, Sadowsky started making new bass guitars, and then signature models.

Models

NYC Range 
The Sadowsky "NYC" line of instruments consists of four- and five-string bass guitars and six-string guitars. The bass guitars have a 34-inch scale length with no current models offered in longer or shorter scale lengths. All Sadowsky basses are available only with bolt-on necks. A weight-reducing chambered body is unique to the NYC range (including Satin series and Deluxe Satin series). The NYC series has a wide range of customisation options. The electronics of the NYC series are all hand wired.

NYC Satin 
The Satin range of NYC basses are made in the same workshop as the NYC basses, with a reduction in colour options with a satin finish. There are no customisation options available. Sadowsky introduced the Verdine White signature bass in the Satin line of instruments.  This bass was built as a tribute to Verdine's late brother, Maurice White.  Two instruments are being donated to the Verdine White Performing Arts Center with proceeds from sales of this model being donated in addition to the instruments. The electronics of the Satin range are pre-wired, and the tuners are Korean made.

The Deluxe Satin range of NYC basses follow the same cost-saving principles as the regular Satin range, but with the addition of flame maple tops at extra cost. The electronics of the Satin range are pre-wired, and the tuners are Korean made.

MetroLine
The Sadowsky Metro line are the basic models of Sadowsky NYC basses made by Sadowsky Tokyo and offers most of the same features, minus the custom options, of the NYC line at a more affordable price. These instruments are made by hand by Yoshi Kikuchi and his team.

The Sadowsky Metro Express line of basses are factory-made instruments made in Japan. These models have a very limited colour choice.

Sadowsky, as of 2003, also offers a line of archtop guitars. There are currently five models available, the Jim Hall model, the Jimmy Bruno model, the semi-hollow model, the LS-17 (long scale/17" lower bout) and the SS-15 (short scale/15" lower bout).

Serial Numbering

NYC Instruments
Instruments manufactured in New York City are assigned as follows:

 Basses, including NYC, Satin and Satin Deluxe are assigned a number, for example #1234.
 Archtop guitars are assigned a number with an ‘A’ prefix, for example #A1234.

Japan (Metro) Instruments
Instruments manufactured in Japan and assigned as follows:

 MetroLine basses are prefixed with an ‘M’ for example #M1234.
 MetroExpress basses are prefixed with an ‘ME’ for example #ME1234.

Players and endorsers

The various archtop guitar models are played and endorsed by many professional guitarists.
Walter Becker The late, great Becker’s main guitar was his signature Walter Becker model Sadowsky. It featured custom Lollar P-90 pickups, spalted maple top and swamp ash body. In the neck/middle and middle/bridge settings, the pickups were wired for humcancelling output. The tiny three-way switch controlled a special preamp that offered separate buffer and gain boosts. The third knob had a push/pull feature that activated the neck/bridge combination with the 5-way switch in either the neck or bridge position
Jim Hall
Prince (Sadowsky made all of the guitars for the Purple Rain Tour)
Jimmy Bruno
Dean Parks
Pat Metheny
Keith Richards
Russell Malone
John Abercrombie
Leonardo Amuedo
Devin Townsend
Hugh McDonald (Bon Jovi)

Sadowsky bass models are used by high-profile musicians
Willie Weeks: the "Sadowsky Vintage P/J 5-string" with the reversed P pickup is his personal model.
Walter Becker
Will Lee: The Will Lee signature model features a custom preamp with switchable midboost with trimpot, frequency selectable at 500 or 800 Hz, wide or narrow bandwidth. This is the only model to feature any kind of midrange equalisation option.
Jason Newsted: he once placed a single order for nine Sadowsky bass guitars. Due to Newsted’s profuse sweating during live performance, his basses feature extensive waterproofing measures throughout to protect the electronics.
Brian Marshall (Alter Bridge and Creed): used them exclusively since 2004.
Tal Wilkenfeld: In 2007, Roger Sadowsky heard this Australian bass player on the instrument, and she accepted an offer made by him as the official endorser of Sadowsky bass guitars.
 Marcus Miller: Although Miller is not known to play Sadowsky basses, his 1977 Fender Jazz Bass is heavily modified with custom Sadowsky electronics.
 Darryl Jones
 Andy Tarrant
 Futoshi Uehara
 John Cowan
 Gary Parker
 Verdine White: The Verdine White Signature Bass is a tribute to Verdine's late brother, Maurice White. It is an addition to the NYC Satin Series has an undersized J-style body of chambered alder, PJ pickups, and a J-bass width neck (1.5” at the nut).
 Adam Clayton
 Greg Lake

References

External links

 Official website
 Roger Sadowsky Interview - NAMM Oral History Library (2016)

Guitar manufacturing companies of the United States
Music of New York City
Manufacturing companies based in New York City
Companies based in Queens, New York
Design companies established in 1979
Manufacturing companies established in 1979
1979 establishments in New York City